The Melaphone Speech Unit was designed in 1970 for booking offices at British Rail stations and has been used for communication in environments such as laboratories and cleanrooms where it  offers protection from air-borne viruses and pathogens.  The COVID-19 pandemic generated new interest in the product which has a resonating membrane and air-sealed construction.  It can increase sound pressure level or voice level by more than four decibels, as compared with wearing a mask alone.

It is built into the new Defender Virus Screens produced by the original manufacturers, Melaphone VisAudio of London,  which has been installed in many doctors’ surgeries, medical centres, clinics and pharmacies in the United Kingdom. A similar product has been produced by the Institute of Technical Education in Singapore.

References 

Building technology
Medical hygiene